The Carolina Flyers, formerly the Raleigh Flyers, are a professional ultimate team from Durham, North Carolina playing in the South Division of the American Ultimate Disc League. The team was founded in 2015. From 2015 through 2018, the Flyers played most of their home games at Crusader Stadium on the campus of Cardinal Gibbons High School in Raleigh, with some home games at WakeMed Soccer Park in Cary. In 2019, the team has played home games at WakeMed Soccer Park in Cary, and other venues. After the 2020 AUDL season was cancelled due to the COVID-19 pandemic, the team moved their home games to Durham County Stadium beginning in 2021. In 2021, the Flyers won the national title. In 2022, the team announced that it was changing its name to the Carolina Flyers.

History

2015
The Flyers won the South Division in their inaugural season, with a record of 11–3. In the divisional playoffs, they beat the Jacksonville Cannons 28–27 in double overtime to advance, where they were defeated 22–19 in the national semifinals by the Madison Radicals. The Flyers signed the first-ever female professional ultimate player, Jessi Jones, to play in their game against the Nashville Nightwatch in May 2015. Jones, who was a team USA U-23 player in 2013, was signed as part of "Women's Ultimate Day".

2016
In 2016, the Flyers finished 9–5, which secured a #2 spot in the AUDL South Division, but were upset in the first round by the visiting #3 seed Atlanta Hustle, 23–25.

2017
With the folding of the Charlotte Express after the 2016 season, the Flyers signed eleven of Charlotte's former players (Matt Bode, Clint McSherry, Jesse Lieberman, Micah Hood, Jeff Nordgren, Taylor Minch, Nate Goff, Shane Sisco, Evan Howey, Jacob Fairfax, Charlie Muniz) as well as AUDL veterans Jonathan "Goose" Helton (Indianapolis AlleyCats, Chicago Wildfire, DC Breeze), Brett Matzuka (Chicago Wildfire, DC Breeze), and Mike Pannone (Rochester Dragons, Pittsburgh Riverhounds) for the 2017 season. The Flyers won the AUDL's first ever regular season cross-divisional match against the DC Breeze 23–21 in overtime on April 22, 2017 as part of the league's "Cross Coast Challenge". The Raleigh Flyers won the South Division with a 13–1 regular season record, but fell to the Dallas Roughnecks in the first round of the divisional playoffs.

The AUDL voted unanimously to recognize Jonathan Nethercutt as the League's Most Valuable Player for 2017.

2018
With the addition of Jakeem Polk, Andrew McKelvey, and Mischa Freystaetter, all previously of the Jacksonville Cannons to their roster, Raleigh was considered a strong pre-season contender. In addition to 12 divisional games, Raleigh played 2 cross-divisional games against the DC Breeze and Madison Radicals. In the game against Madison, Raleigh gave Madison only its 2nd ever loss at home and Madison's largest margin of defeat ever (8 points). Raleigh was the only team to defeat Madison during their run to the 2018 AUDL Championship. Raleigh finished the regular season as the #2 seed in the South Division with 10 wins and 4 losses. After defeating the Austin Sol in the divisional play-off game 26–23, they lost to the Dallas Roughnecks 19–20 in the divisional championship game after being up 6 goals just after halftime.

2019
Raleigh finished the season at 10–2 and won the South Division with their only 2 regular season losses coming against the Dallas Roughnecks and New York Empire, the two teams that would subsequently play for the AUDL Championship. Raleigh sent Jacob Fairfax and Henry Fisher to the inaugural AUDL All-Star weekend in Madison, Wisconsin. Raleigh was eliminated from the playoffs by the Dallas Roughnecks by a score of 19–17.

2020
The 2020 AUDL Season was cancelled due to the COVID-19 pandemic

2021
Due to ongoing travel restrictions due to the COVID-19 pandemic, the Canadian teams in the AUDL were grouped into a single division to compete for the AUDL Canada Cup and the other AUDL divisions were re-aligned. Raleigh found themselves in an 8-team Eastern division, bringing along South Division teams Atlanta and Tampa Bay while former South Division teams Dallas Roughnecks and Austin Sol were moved to the West Division. In the East Division, they now faced the reigning AUDL Champions New York Empire as well as the DC Breeze, 2 of the 3 teams that they had faced in cross-divisional regular season play. With 8 teams in the East Division, and only 5 and 6 teams respectively in the Central and West Divisions, the East was allotted 2 playoff berths to the Final Four Weekend, and the Central, and West only allotted 1. Raleigh finished the season at 8–4 with 1 loss to the Atlanta Hustle, 1 loss to New York Empire, and 2 losses to the DC Breeze. This put them in 4th in the regular season standings behind those 3 teams which qualified them to play a semifinal game against the #1 seed. The Flyers have won their first AUDL title after defeating the New York Empire 19–16 at the championship round.

Season by Season

All-Time Record by Opponent 
This table reflects games through the end of the 2021 regular season.

References

Sports in Raleigh-Durham
Ultimate teams established in 2015
Ultimate (sport) teams
2015 establishments in North Carolina